2013-2014 VHL season — the 4th season of the Supreme Hockey League championship. Began on September 8, 2013, in Neftekamsk by opening match between Toros and Saryarka. The winner of the match and the holder of the Opening Cup was Toros. On April 28, 2014, Saryarka won in the sixth game of the final series of Rubin Tyumen and became the winner of the Cup Bratina. In accordance with the regulations, "Rubin" became the winner of all-Russian competitions on hockey (VHL).

Regular season

Form 
Twenty seven VHL teams was united to the one group. Duaring the regular season the team played with every opponent in 2 matches — one home and away. All teams will play 50 matches.

Playoffs

References 

Russian Major League seasons
SHL
SHL